Pengiran Anak Puteri Hajah Rashidah Sa’adatul Bolkiah Secondary School is a government secondary school located in Lumut, a settlement area in Belait District, Brunei. Kamal Bahrin Jamal is the current acting principal of the school.

Name 
The school is named after Princess Rashidah, the eldest daughter of Sultan Hassanal Bolkiah, the 29th and current Sultan of Brunei.

History
Before this school was built, the people of Lumut until Kg Tunggulian had to study in Anthony Abell College, Seria or Perdana Wazir Secondary School, Kuala Belait. While the people from Labi to the interior part of Belait district studied in Perdana Wazir Secondary School because it was the only school in Belait district that had hostels. The school celebrated its silver jubilee held around the school on 30 April 2019.

Academics
Like other secondary schools in Brunei Darussalam, this school teaches students from year 7 to year 11 (normal track), year 7 to year 10 express (fast track), year 7 to year 11 (Edexcel) and Special Need students.

Subjects
Like other secondary schools, this school offers core subjects such as Malay language, English language, Mathematics, Science (Physics, Chemistry, Biology & Combined Science) and Islamic Religious Knowledge (IRK). Option subjects include Design and Technology (D&T), Art and Design, Business Art Technology (BAT), Computer Study, Additional Mathematics, History, Food and Nutrition, Geography and Malay Literature. Other, non-examinable subjects include Physical Education and Melayu Islam Beraja (MIB).

Co-Curricular Activities 
On the CCA Awards Day, the school recognized its pupils for their outstanding accomplishments in co-curricular activities (CCA). During the occasion, certificates and medals were given to pupils who had placed first in events as well as to those who had represented the school abroad.

Infrastructure
Generally, the school's buildings look like Sayyidina Ali Secondary School in Kuala Belait, Sayyidina Hasan Secondary School in Mulaut, Rimba I Secondary School in Rimba and few other secondary schools in Brunei Darussalam. From the main gate / entrance, the road heads to the Administration building, the field / sport complex to the left and the waiting area / drop off area to the right. There is a multi purpose hall, a rectangular shaped three storey building for classrooms and two blocks for specialised subjects. Unique to this school is a bungalow behind the Administration building which houses the Special Need students. There are also a library, a "surau" and two canteen shops. The sport complex consists of a unique rectangular shaped jogging track, a standard size football pitch, a grandstand and a futsal pitch.

See also 
 List of secondary schools in Brunei

References

Secondary schools in Brunei
Cambridge schools in Brunei